Liévin is a commune in the Pas-de-Calais department in northern France. The inhabitants are called Liévinois.

Overview
The town of Liévin is an old mining area of Pas-de-Calais. Near Lens, this town is of modest size but has several nursery schools, schools, colleges, a university, a swimming pool, a city library, a cultural and social center (CCS), a hospital, a covered stadium, several gardens and parks, two movie theaters, two cemeteries, a Catholic church, a shopping center, a National Police station, a fire station, a complete intercommunity transportation system (Tadao ), regional newspapers, the main ones being L'Avenir de l'Artois [the Future of Artois], La Voix du Nord (Voice of the North) and Nord Éclair (Northern Flash), etc.

Administration
Liévin is the seat of two cantons. It belongs to the Agglomeration community of Lens – Liévin) which consists of 36 communes, with a total population of 250,000 inhabitants.

History

Prehistory and Middle Ages
The history of Liévin begins in ancient times. The foothill of Riaumont (highest point in Liévin) is a rich archaeological site.  Traces of Neolithic and Gallo-Roman periods have been found there, and 752 tombs attest that Liévin was once a Merovingian burial ground.

In 1414, there were barely 150 inhabitants in Liévin.  At that time, it was a village mainly concerned with agriculture.  The population grew steadily until the First World War. 

 600 inhabitants in 1759
 900 inhabitants in 1789
 1223 inhabitants in 1820

Industrial Revolution

Coal was discovered in the vicinity of Lens, Pas-de-Calais in 1849, and near Liévin in 1857.  This precipitated a time of great productivity, prosperity, and population growth. The population of Liévin was 25,698 in 1914.

From 1858, the Lens mining company opened its pit no. 3 - 3 bis in the city, the Aix mining company its pit of Aix, which ten years later became no. 2 of Liévin, and the Liévin mining company its pit no. 1 bis - 1 ter. Secondary pits opened later. From 1899, the latter opened its pit no. 5 - 5 bis. During the 20th century, the Lens mining company opened its ventilation shafts no. 9 bis, 11 bis and 16 bis. The last shafts were backfilled in 1979, the installations were destroyed, with the exception of the headframes of shafts 1 bis and 3 bis.

World War I
The First World War brutally ended Liévin's expansion.  The city was ruined, the churches and castles destroyed.  Human losses were 400 civilian and 600 military, and it saw severe fighting during the Battle of Loos, which took place not far to the north.  The city of Liévin was awarded the Croix de Guerre in 1920.

After the war, it was necessary to rebuild everything.  After a few years, Liévin was again an active city, and mining recommenced. In 1936, the nearby (5.6 km) Canadian National Vimy Memorial was dedicated to the Battle of Vimy Ridge (part of the Battle of Arras) and the Canadian forces killed during the First World War; it is also the site of two WWI Canadian cemeteries.

World War II

World War II again stopped the progress of the city.  In 1940, Liévin was evacuated, and the city was occupied by the Germans.  Resistance was organized, in particular with the help of the Voix du Nord newspaper which is nowadays the main daily newspaper of Nord-Pas-de-Calais.  In this war, there were 220 civilian and 225 military casualties.  Liévin was liberated on 2 September 1944 by the British Eighth Army.

After the war, mining recommenced in force; coal mining was vital to the reconstruction of the French economy.  Silicosis, which would kill many miners, made its appearance.

End of coal mining
In addition to silicosis, miners were in daily peril of being lost in mining catastrophes. There were five major mining catastrophes during the coal mining period:

 28 November 1861, pit no. 1, 2 dead
 13 August 1882, pit no. 3, 8 dead
 14 January 1885, pit no. 1, 28 dead
 28 January 1907, pit no. 3, 3 dead
 16 March 1957, pit no. 3, 10 dead
 27 December 1974, Saint-Amé pit, 42 dead

Additionally, a recession in the mining industry began and with it a recession in Liévin.  From 1960 to 1970, 60 of the 67 pits closed.  Following the tragedy in pit number 3 in Saint-Amé, the last coal mining pit closed in 1974.  Liévin no longer produces coal, and has moved on to a new chapter.

In 2014, French Prime Minister Manuel Valls commemorates the 40th anniversary of the Saint-Amé tragedy.

Liévin without coal and beginning of the 21st century
Liévin suffered a great deal when coal mining was abandoned, since it had depended primarily on the mines. The city converted to other industries. While it may not have the same economic dynamism of the earlier epoch, the commercial and industrial areas are a source of employment for many, and the city remains relatively prosperous with 33,430 inhabitants (see above).

A major storage facility for the Louvre is located in Liévin. It houses approximately 250,000 items.

On February 2, 2022, French current President Emmanuel Macron goes to Liévin to the remembrance stone of Saint-Amé. With members of the Young Municipal Council, the mayor Laurent Duporge and his constituents, he lays a wreath of flowers in tribute to the 42 miners who died on December 27, 1974, in the biggest European post-war mining disaster: before him, Prime Ministers Jacques Chirac, Manuel Valls and President François Mitterrand had visited the site. He then participates in a work reunion with locals politicians, especially about the renovation of mining housing and the revitalization of the territory. At the end of the day, he visits the Louvre-Lens museum where students present The Seated Scribe, a famous work of ancient Egyptian art.

Lefebvre family and sinking of the Titanic

In 2017, a letter written in French is found sealed in a bottle on a beach in Hopewell Rocks, Bay of Fundy, in the Canadian province of New Brunswick. It claims to be written by Mathilde Lefebvre, a 12-year-old passager of the Titanic travelling with her mother, brothers and sisters. The message says ""I am throwing this bottle into the sea in the middle of the Atlantic. We are due to arrive in New York in a few days. If anyone finds it, tell the Lefebvre family in Liévin".

In March 2022, Coraline Hausenblas, a psychomotricity specialist who carefully studied the letter, claims in a 51 pages report that the document is "fake, as long as it cannot be proved true". Even though the letter is fake, it sheds light on the history of this family. In 2002, the city of Liévin built a remembrance stone in tribute to the five family members who died during the sinking. In 1911, Franck Lefebvre, Mathilde's father, a 40-year-old coal miner, decided to settle in the United States thanks to a friend who also wanted to leave France and who offered him the trip. Franck arrived in the United States in March 1911 with one of his sons, Anselme, born in 1901, and settled in Iowa where he worked in the Lodwick mines. During one year, he saves money and sends it to Liévin to allow his family to join him. In April 1912, his wife Marie Lefebvre, born Daumont (1872-1912), as well as their four children, Mathilde (1899-1912), 12-year-old, Jeanne (1903-1912), 8-year-old, Henri (1906-1912), 5-year-old and Ida (1908-1912), 3-year-old, left Liévin to join him. They embarked at Southampton on Wednesday, April 10, 1912 aboard the Titanic in third class. The five family members died during the sinking and their bodies were never found. In the United States, while Franck is looking for them, the American administration realizes that he entered the territory illegally and he was expelled. He then returned to Liévin, became a coal miner again and died in 1948 in Haillicourt.

Mayors of Liévin since the French Revolution

 1790–1810, Procope-Alexandre-Joseph de Ligne
 1810–1819, Pierre Caron
 1820–1822, Jacques Delaby
 1822–1825, Pierre Caron
 1825–1856, Henri-Antoine de Ligne
 1856–1871, Nicolas Antoine Delaby
 1871–1878, Alexandre-Procope Comte Jonglez de Ligne
 1879–1892, Louis Schmidt
 1892, Félix Pamart
 1893–1905, Edouard Defernez
 1905–1912, Arthur Lamendin
 1912–1913, Pierre Leroy
 1914, François Pouvier
 1914–1919 : (evacuation)
 1919–1925, Léon Degreaux
 1925–1929, Jules Bédart
 1930–1935, Silas Goulet
 1936–1939, Henri-Joseph Thiébaut
 1939–1944, Louis Thobois
 1944–1945, Henri Bertin
 1945–1947, Florimond Lemaire
 1947–1952, Eugène Gossart
 1952–1981, Henri Darras
 1981–2013, Jean-Pierre Kucheida
 2013–present, Laurent Duporge

Population

Notable people
Famous people from Liévin include:

 Georges Carpentier (boxer)
 Robert Enrico (film director)
 Arnold Sowinski (footballer)
 Mounir Chouiar (footballer)

International relations

Liévin is twinned with:

 Hohenlimburg, Germany (since 1962)
 Pasvalys, Lithuania (since 1999)
 Bruck an der Mur, Austria (since 1999)
 La Valette-du-Var, France (since 2000)
 Roccastrada, Italy

 Rybnik, Poland (since 2000)

References

External links

 Town council website 

Communes of Pas-de-Calais
Artois